This is a list of Nepali actors. Arranged alphabetically on basis of first letter of their surname.

A 
 Hari Bansha Acharya
 Nisha Adhikari
 Keki Adhikari

B 
 Anup Baral
 Nischal Basnet
 Biraj Bhatta
 Bhuwan K.C.

C 
 Sushil Chhetri

D 
 Neeta Dhungana

G 
 Gajit Bista
 Tulsi Ghimire
 Kedar Ghimire
 Shrawan Ghimire
 Deepak Raj Giri
 Laxmi Giri
 Jeewan Gurung
 Sipora Gurung
 Rishma Gurung

H 
 Rajesh Hamal
 Najir Hussain

J 
 Rabindra Jha
 Aashirman DS Joshi
 Ayushman Joshi
 Malina Joshi

K 
 Sushma Karki
 Priyanka Karki
 Arjun Karki
 Sitaram Kattel
 Anmol K.C.
 Nandita K.C.
 Swastima Khadka
 Sumi Khadka
 Pradeep Khadka
Manisha Koirala
 Raj Ballav Koirala

L 
 Khagendra Lamichhane
 Arunima Lamsal
 Jiwan Luitel
 Sanchita Luitel

M 
 Krishna Malla
 Saugat Malla
 Gauri Malla
 Sharmila Malla
 Melina Manandhar
 Karishma Manandhar
 Zenisha Moktan

N 
 Tripti Nadakar
 Ashishma Nakarmi
 Jitu Nepal

P 
 Garima Panta
 Mariska Pokharel
 Sunil Pokharel
 Usha Poudel
 Deepika Prasain

R 
 Dayahang Rai
 Alisha Rai
 Wilson Bikram Rai
 Usha Rajak
 Sunil Rawal
 Dilip Rayamajhi
 Manoj RC
 Hari Prasad Rimal
 Nima Rumba

S 

 Jal Shah
 Neer Shah
 Paul Shah
 Samragyee R.L. Shah
 Shiva Shankar
 Aanchal Sharma
 Anna Sharma
 Pooja Sharma
 Reecha Sharma
 Madan Krishna Shrestha
 Namrata Shrestha
 Prakriti Shrestha
 Shiv Shrestha
 Shree Krishna Shrestha
 Shristi Shrestha
 Aryan Sigdel
 Mahima Silwal
 Niruta Singh
 Barsha Siwakoti
 Malvika Subba

T 
 Suraj Singh Thakuri
 Upasana Singh Thakuri
 Arpan Thapa
 Bipana Thapa
 Jharna Thapa
 Rekha Thapa
 Sunil Thapa

U 
 Nikhil Upreti

See also
Cinema of Nepal
List of Nepal-related topics

External links

Nepalese actors
Nepalese actresses
Nepalese male actors
Nepal
A